Bromsgrove is a local government district in Worcestershire, England.  Its council is based in the town of Bromsgrove. It borders the built up area of Birmingham to the north. Other places in the district include Alvechurch, Aston Fields, Belbroughton, Catshill, Clent, Hagley, Rubery, Stoke Prior and Wythall. The current district was formed on 1 April 1974 by the merger of Bromsgrove urban district and Bromsgrove rural district. Bromsgrove forms part of the Greater Birmingham & Solihull Local Enterprise Partnership.

Population
The following table illustrates the change in the district's population between 1801 and 2011.

Transport
Bromsgrove railway station is the local station for the district's centre, but there are several others within the district. Road travel, especially to Birmingham, is also important in the district.

Barnt Green railway station and Alvechurch railway station are on the line to Redditch.

Hagley railway station and Wythall railway station are also on lines leading into Birmingham, which pass through the edges of the district.

Bromsgrove is situated on Route 5 and 46 of the National Cycle Network. This gives cyclists easy access to Droitwich, Redditch, Birmingham and beyond.

See also
New Frankley
Bromsgrove Parliamentary Constituency
Bromsgrove District Council elections

References

 
Non-metropolitan districts of Worcestershire
1974 establishments in England